Ictericodes depuncta is a species of tephritid or fruit flies in the genus Ictericodes of the family Tephritidae.

Distribution
Russia, China.

References

Tephritinae
Insects described in 1936
Diptera of Asia